The 10th Assembly of Murcia is the current meeting of the Regional Assembly of Murcia, with the membership determined by the results of the 2019 regional election held on 26 May 2019. The parliament met for the first time on 11 June 2019. According to the Statute of Autonomy of Murcia the maximum legislative term of assembly is 4 years from the preceding election.

Election 
The 10th Murcian regional elections was held on 26 May 2019. At the election the Spanish Socialist Workers' Party (PSOE) became the largest party in the Assembly but fell short of a majority.

History 
The new parliament met for the first time on 11 June 2019 and Alberto Castillo (Cs) was elected as President of the Assembly of Murcia with the support of PP and Cs.

Deaths, resignations and suspensions 
The 10th Assembly of Murcia has seen the following deaths, resignations and suspensions:

 28 September 2019 - Óscar Urralburu and María Giménez (Podemos) resigned in order to join Más País, a split from Podemos lead by Iñigo Errejón. María Marín and Rafael Esteban (Podemos) replaced them on 18 and 23 October 2019, respectively.
 25 October 2019 - Javier Celdrán, María Cristina Sánchez and Antonio Luengo (PP) resigned after being appointed ministers in the new regional government. Francisco José Espejo (PP) decided not to take his seat. Isabel María Sánchez, María Inmaculada Lardín and Juan Antonio Mata (PP) replaced them on 13 November 2019.
 21 June 2020 - Emilio Ivars (PSOE) resigned. Later that year his party accused him of leaking information to the media without consent. María Hernández (PSOE) replaced him on 16 September 2020.
 13 December 2021 - Diego Conesa (PSOE), leader of the socialist group, resigned. Early that year he had announced that he will not run for reelection as Secretary General of the PSRM. José Antonio Campos (PSOE) replaced him on 17 December 2021.
 14 December 2022 - Rafael Esteban (Podemos) resigned to go back to his job.

Members

References

Regional Assembly of Murcia